Park Kun-ha (born 25 July 1971 in Daejeon, South Korea) is a retired South Korean footballer.

Career
He started his professional career in 1996 as the founding member of Suwon Samsung Bluewings. At first, he played as a striker and scored many goals and help the Bluewings to win the championship in 1998 and 1999 and Asian Champions Cup and Asian Super Cup in 2001 and 2002, respectively. Later, he changed his position to defender and helped the Bluewings to win their third championship in the history.

He retired in 2006 and became an assistant coach of the first team at the Suwon Bluewings. In 2009, he became the manager of Suwon Bluewings U18 team (Maetan High School Football Club).

With Bluewings, he won three K-League championships and also won the Rookie of the Year award in the 1996 season.

Club statistics

National team statistics

International goals
Results list South Korea's goal tally first.

References

External links
 
 
 

 

1971 births
Living people
Sportspeople from Daejeon
Association football utility players
South Korean footballers
South Korean expatriate footballers
South Korea international footballers
Suwon Samsung Bluewings players
Kashiwa Reysol players
K League 1 players
J1 League players
Expatriate footballers in Japan
South Korean expatriate sportspeople in Japan
South Korean football managers
Seoul E-Land FC managers
Association football defenders
Association football forwards